La sposa (Italian for The bride) is a 1958 Italian melodrama film directed by Edmondo Lozzi.

Cast 

Irène Tunc: Flora
Carlo Giuffré: Maurizio
Patrizia Remiddi: Ornella
Aldo Bufi Landi: Mario
Anna Maria Mazzarini: Mariella
Beniamino Maggio: Beniamino
Leda Gloria: Aunt Susanna
Mario De Vico: Caifa 
Angela Luce: Margherita
Ugo D'Alessio: il parroco

References

External links

1958 drama films
1958 films
Italian drama films
Melodrama films
Italian black-and-white films
1950s Italian films
1950s Italian-language films